The 2009 Losail Superbike World Championship round was the second round of the 2009 Superbike World Championship season. It took place on the weekend of March 12–14, 2009, at the Losail International Circuit in Qatar.

Results

Superbike race 1

Superbike race 2

Supersport race

References
 Superbike Race 1 (Archived 2009-07-30)
 Superbike Race 2
 Supersport Race

External links
 The official website of the Losail International Circuit
 The official website of the Superbike World Championship

Losail
Superbike World Championship